During World War I, many German or German-sounding place names in Australia were changed due to anti-German sentiment. The presence of German-derived place names was seen as an affront to the war effort at the time.

The names were often changed by being anglicised (such as Peterborough), or by being given new names of Aboriginal origin (Kobandilla, Karawirra) or in commemoration of notable soldiers (Kitchener and Holbrook) or World War I battlefields (Verdun, The Somme).

New South Wales

Queensland

South Australia  
The South Australian Nomenclature Act 1917 authorised the compilation and gazetting of a list of place-names contained in a report of the previous October prepared by a parliamentary "nomenclature committee", and authorised the Governor of South Australia, by proclamation, to "alter any place-name which he deems to be of enemy origin to some other name specified in the proclamation". The table below includes the 69 changes gazetted on 10 January 1918.

The Nomenclature Act 1935 restored the former names of the towns of Hahndorf and Lobethal, and  the Adelaide suburb of Klemzig. About 20 other names were reverted in the 1970s and 1980s; some of them were assigned to larger localities rather than reverting to the original place name, as also shown in the table.

Tasmania

Victoria

Western Australia

See also
 German Australian
 German settlement in Australia
 Berlin to Kitchener name change, parallel phenomenon in Canada
 Kitchener bun

References

External links
Adelaide Co-operative History – German Place Names
South Australian History – German placenames
Australian Bureau of Statistics – Changing of German Place Names in Australia
Victorian counties map

German
German
Place names changed from German names
Place names changed from German names
Place names changed from German names
Lists of cities by toponymy
Anti-German sentiment
German-Australian culture
Place names changed from German names
Changed from German names
City name changes